Walter Mark Cooke (18 November 1876 – 22 April 1927) was an Australian rules footballer who played with Geelong in the Victorian Football League (VFL).

Notes

External links 

1876 births
1927 deaths
Australian rules footballers from Victoria (Australia)
Geelong Football Club players